Antoinette de Beaucaire or Marie-Antoinette Rivière (21 January 1840, in Nîmes, France – 27 January 1865) was an Occitan language writer. Her works include Li Velugo or "The Sparklets."

References 

French women poets
Occitan-language writers
People from Nîmes
1840 births
1865 deaths
19th-century women writers